Rameshwer Singh Sangha (born June 6, 1945) is a former Canadian politician who served as Member of Parliament (MP) for the riding of Brampton Centre from 2015 to 2021. He was first elected in the 2015 federal election and was re-elected in 2019.

On January 25, 2021, Sangha was removed from the Liberal caucus based on accusations he made that multiple other Liberal MPs supported the Khalistan movement — allegations the Liberal Party deemed "baseless". He then sat as an independent in the House of Commons. Sangha voiced these allegations publicly in a 2019 interview with the Punjabi-language channel 5AAB. Mark Holland, the Government Chief Whip, issued a statement reading: "As we have made clear time and time again, we will not tolerate conspiracy theories, or dangerous and unfounded rhetoric about Parliamentarians or other Canadians. Unfortunately, it is not uncommon for many Canadians to experience suspicions because of their background; we all know where this can lead." He did not seek re-election in the 2021 federal election.

Electoral history

References

Liberal Party of Canada MPs
Living people
Members of the House of Commons of Canada from Ontario
Lawyers in Ontario
University of Windsor alumni
Canadian politicians of Punjabi descent
Canadian politicians of Indian descent
21st-century Canadian politicians
1945 births
Politicians from Brampton
Politicians affected by a party expulsion process